The 2019 Rugby Europe Under-18 Sevens Championship was held in Gdańsk, Poland from 17–18 August. Ireland beat Spain 26–12 in the finals to win the championship.

Teams

Pool stages

Pool A

Pool B

Pool C

Finals 
Cup Quarterfinals

Shield Semifinals

Challenge Trophy Semifinals

Final standings

References 

2019
2019 rugby sevens competitions
2019 in European sport